"You Know That I Love You" is a song by American recording artist Donell Jones, released on April 9, 2002 as the first single from the album, Life Goes On (2002). Jazz saxophonist Kim Waters covers "You Know That I Love You" on his 2002 album titled Someone to Love You, and Kim Waters' cover was picked by several Urban AC stations and some stations such as KJLH in Los Angeles played the Donell Jones version with the jazz mixed in late 2002, which started playing the original R&B version on the week of March 25, 2002. The single received major airplay on Mainstream Urban, CHR/Rhythmic and Urban AC radio stations. KKBT in Los Angeles started playing it on April 1, 2002 a week after it officially it impacted Urban Radio.

Music video
The music video for "You Know That I Love You" was directed by Chris Robinson and it first aired on the week of April 15, 2002.

Track listing
UK CD-Single

Charts

Weekly charts

Year-end charts

References

2002 singles
Donell Jones songs
Music videos directed by Chris Robinson (director)
2001 songs
Contemporary R&B ballads
2000s ballads